The following is a list of Major League Baseball players, retired or active. As of the end of the 2011 season, there have been 833 players with a last name that begins with P who have been on a major league roster at some point.

P
For reasons of space, this list has been split into two pages:
 Charlie Pabor through Monte Pfyl
 Bill Phebus through Tim Pyznarski

External links
Last Names starting with P - Baseball-Reference.com

 P